Frederick Herman Meyer (June 26, 1876 – March 6, 1961) was an American architect. He was active in the San Francisco Bay Area, and is known for designing the YMCA Hotel in San Francisco. From c.1898 until 1901, Samuel Newsom worked with Meyer, to form the firm Newsom and Meyer in Oakland.

Frederick Herman Meyer was born on Telegraph Hill, San Francisco, his father John Nicholas Meyer was a German immigrant, cabinet maker.

Buildings 

 California Hall (formerly Das Deutsches Haus), San Francisco, 1912, which is listed as a San Francisco Designated Landmark
 The Belgravia, San Francisco, 1913
 Exposition Auditorium (now known as the Bill Graham Civic Auditorium), San Francisco, 1915
 YMCA Hotel, San Francisco, 1928, which is listed in the National Register of Historic Places

References 

1876 births
1961 deaths
Architects from San Francisco
20th-century American architects
American people of German descent